Fash FC was a weekly UK television programme. It was a reality/documentary show which followed ex-professional footballer John Fashanu as he went back to the grassroots of football, managing a team of amateur players in a Sunday League.  The show was launched in September 2003, and was broadcast throughout the 2003–2004 football season on Bravo. The show received a re-run on Loaded TV, the Sky satellite platform Channel 200 and online.

Overview

Fash FC competed in the 2003–2004 Hendon Sunday Premier League in London, they played their home games at Claremont Road, the former home of Hendon Football Club.

For the show, Fash FC played in the suburb of Cricklewood, within the London Borough of Barnet, at a ground simply known by the local road name, Claremont Road. The ground was owned by Hendon Football Club.

Show staff

Notable players
Warren Waugh

References

External links

Notes
The IMDb page for the TV show "Football Challenge" on their website, this is incorrect and the show was actually called "Fash FC".

2000s British sports television series
2000s British reality television series
2003 British television series debuts
2004 British television series endings
Loaded TV original programming
Bravo (British TV channel) original programming
Association football clubs established in 2003
Association football clubs disestablished in 2004